The Significant New Alternatives Policy (also known as Section 612 of the Clean Air Act or SNAP, promulgated at 40 CFR part 82 Subpart G) is a program of the EPA to determine acceptable chemical substitutes, and establish which are prohibited or regulated by the EPA.  It also establishes a program by which new alternatives may be accepted, and promulgates timelines to the industry regarding phase-outs of substitutes.

Scope

Originally, Section 612 was limited by ozone-depleting chemicals.  However, after passing regulations to phase-out R134a, an HFC refrigerant with no ozone-depleting potential, this phase-out was defended by a subsidiary of DuPont siding with the EPA as it was challenged by a major manufacturer of R134a, and was struck down in 2017.  This decision was upheld in 2018.  In 2021, a new law was passed as part of the appropriations bill extending the EPA's scope to substances with high GWP as well.

The EPA looks at available chemical substitutes in the following industrial sectors:
Adhesives, Coatings, and Inks
Aerosols
Cleaning Solvents
Fire Suppression and Explosion Protection
Foam Blowing Agents
Refrigeration and Air Conditioning
Sterilants
Tobacco Expansion

Evaluations are ongoing as technological understanding improves, and can only prohibit substance where the EPA has determined other available substitutes that pose less overall risk to human health and the environment.

Submittal process

In order to submit new proposed chemicals, along with general contact and marketing information, for a complete submittal, the EPA requires reports on:
Impurities
Byproducts
Degradation Products
Test Marketing
Physical Properties including:
molecular weight
physical state
melting point
boiling point
specific gravity
If a blend
bubble point
dew point
If flammable
lower flammability limit
upper flammability limit
flash point
Ozone Depletion Potential (ODP)
Global Warming Potential (GWP)
VOC content
Proposed cost
Toxicity Limits
Permissible Exposure Limits (PELs)
Short-Term Exposure Limits (STELs)
Threshold Limit Values (TLVs)
Recommended Exposure Limits (RELs)
Workplace Environmental Exposure Limits (WEELs)
acceptable exposure limits (AELs)
Toxicological studies
SDS
Environmental/Health and Safety Law Review
Industry/Application-specific Use Profile

Refrigerants

One important, changing aspect of SNAP is its effect on the HVAC industry.  Particularly because it decides which refrigerants may be legally used, it coordinates refrigerant phaseouts in the U.S., and which are prohibited against venting in concordance with Section 608.  The following is a list of accepted refrigerants, or phase-out periods according to the EPA.

See also
 ASHRAE - Standards 15 and 34 are necessary part of most submittal processes to the program
 Clean Air Act - The act that established section 612
 EPA - The central regulatory agency in charge of operating the SNAP program
 Section 608 - Which helps enforce the chemicals listed as part of the program
 Title 40 of the Code of Federal Regulations

References

External links
 CFR section promulgating up-to-date provisions for Section 612
 EPA SNAP Website

Air pollution in the United States
Code of Federal Regulations
Construction
Heating, ventilation, and air conditioning
Environmental law in the United States
Environmental policy in the United States
Refrigerants
Regulators of biotechnology products
United States Environmental Protection Agency
United States federal environmental legislation